Sauli may refer to:

People
Alexander Sauli (1535–1592), from Milan, beatified by Benedict XIV, and canonized by Pope Pius X
Anneli Sauli (1932–2022), Finnish film actress
Jalmari Sauli (1889–1957), Finnish writer and track and field athlete
Sauli Koskinen (born 1985), Finnish TV/radio personality and entertainment reporter
Sauli Lehtonen (1975–1995), Finnish tango singer
Sauli Niinistö (born 1948), current President of Finland
Sauli Rytky (1918–2006), Finnish cross-country skier
Sauli Väisänen (born 1994), Finnish footballer

Other uses
Denticetopsis sauli, a species of catfish of the family Cetopsidae
Hyloxalus sauli, a species of frog in the family Dendrobatidae

Finnish masculine given names